American Nietzsche: A History of an Icon and His Ideas is a 2011 book about the reception of Friedrich Nietzsche in the United States by Jennifer Ratner-Rosenhagen. It won the American Historical Association's John H. Dunning Prize (2013), Society for U.S. Intellectual History Annual Book Award (2013), and Morris D. Forkosch Prize for the Best First Book in Intellectual History (2013).

References

External links 

 

2011 non-fiction books
Books about Friedrich Nietzsche
Books about the United States
English-language books
University of Chicago Press books